Cardigan is a federal electoral district in Prince Edward Island, Canada, that has been represented in the House of Commons of Canada since 1968.

The electoral district was created in 1966 from parts of the ridings of King's and Queen's, with minor modifications to its boundaries since. The boundaries of this electoral district stayed unchanged for the 2012 federal electoral redistribution.

Geography

Under the Representation Order, the geographic boundaries of this riding are described as follows:

Consisting of:

(a) the County of Kings;

(b) that part of the County of Queens : lots 35, 36, 37, 48, 49, 50, 57, 58, 60 and 62; the Town of Stratford; and

(c) Governors Island and all other islands adjacent to the County of Kings and to the above-mentioned lots.

(See the map of Cardigan riding.)

Political geography

In the 2008 election, every poll except two voted Liberal. The only two polls that didn't, voted Conservative. These two polls were centred in the town of Georgetown, Prince Edward Island.

Demographics

Members of parliament

This riding has elected the following members of parliament:

Election results

2021 general election

2019 general election

2015 general election

2011 general election

2008 general election

2006 general election

2004 general election

2000 general election

1997 general election

1993 general election

1988 general election

1984 general election

1981 by-election

1980 general election

1979 general election

1974 general election

1972 general election

1968 general election

Student vote results

2011 election
In 2011, a student vote was conducted at participating Canadian schools to parallel the 2011 Canadian federal election results. The vote was designed to educate students and simulate the electoral process for persons who have not yet reached the legal majority. Schools with a large student body that reside in another electoral district had the option to vote for candidates outside of the electoral district where they were physically located.

See also
 List of Canadian federal electoral districts
 Past Canadian electoral districts

References

 Cardigan riding from Elections Canada
 
 Election Financial Reports from Elections Canada

Notes

Prince Edward Island federal electoral districts